Fort Richardson National Cemetery is a United States National Cemetery located on the Fort Richardson United States Army installation near Anchorage, Alaska. It encompasses  and as of the end of 2020, it had more than 8,000 interments. For much of the year, the gravesites are inaccessible due to snowfall.

History 

Established during World War II, the site was set aside to bury soldiers of any nationality who died in Alaska. After the war, many of the remains were disinterred and returned to their places of origin. Some remained at the cemetery, including 235 Japanese soldiers who died in the Battle of the Aleutian Islands which were exhumed in 1953 to be cremated in proper Shinto and Buddhist ceremonies under the supervision of Japanese government representatives. In 1981, Japanese residents of Anchorage erected a marker at the site of their interment.

On May 28, 1984 the cemetery became a National Cemetery, administered by the  United States Department of Veterans Affairs.

Notable monuments 
 A memorial stone gateway for Major Kermit Roosevelt, erected in 1949.
 The Japan Monument, first erected in 1981 to honor the 235 Japanese interred at the cemetery. It was replaced with a new monument in 2002.

Notable interments 

 Kermit Roosevelt (1889–1943), son of President Theodore Roosevelt and Army Major during World War II.
 James Leroy Bondsteel (1947–1987), Medal of Honor recipient for action in the Vietnam War.
 Robert O. Bowen (1920–2003), novelist and essayist. Navy Veteran during WWII.

See also 
 List of cemeteries in Alaska
 National Register of Historic Places listings in Anchorage, Alaska

References

External links

 
 
 

1942 establishments in Alaska
Cemeteries in Alaska
Historic American Landscapes Survey in Alaska
United States national cemeteries
Protected areas of Anchorage, Alaska
Cemeteries on the National Register of Historic Places in Alaska
Buildings and structures on the National Register of Historic Places in Anchorage, Alaska
World War II on the National Register of Historic Places in Alaska
Cemeteries established in the 1940s